This article presents a list of the historical events and publications of Australian literature during 2006.

Events
South African-born Nobel laureate J.M. Coetzee takes up Australian citizenship
Australia's Prime Minister, John Howard, complains about the modern school English syllabus, stating that it is being "dumbed down"
Peter Carey's ex-wife, Alison Summers, takes a swipe at the author, accusing him of using his fiction to settle some old scores. She refers to a minor character in Carey's novel Theft: A Love Story (called The Plaintiff) and announces she is also writing a novel, titled Mrs Jekyll
the ABC board decides against publishing the new Chris Masters' book Jonestown, an unauthorised biography of Alan Jones, a Sydney radio presenter
the Australian Classification Review Board bans two radical Islamic books, prompting calls from the Australian Attorney-General for the Board to provide with even tougher laws
a large treasure trove of missing papers belonging to Patrick White is revealed to the public. Contrary to the wishes expressed in White's will, his literary executor, Barbara Mobbs, did not destroy the material but kept it and has since offered it to the National Library of Australia

Major publications

Literary fiction

 Azhar Abidi – Passarola Rising
 Venero Armanno – Candle Life
 Max Barry – Company
 James Bradley – The Resurrectionist
 Peter Carey – Theft: A Love Story
 John Charalambous – Silent Parts
 Tegan Bennett Daylight – Safety
 Richard Flanagan – The Unknown Terrorist
 Sandra Hall – Beyond the Break
 Sheridan Hay – The Secret of Lost Things
 M.J. Hyland – Carry Me Down
 Gail Jones – Dreams of Speaking
 Simone Lazaroo – The Travel Writer
 Kate Legge – The Unexpected Elements of Love
Angelo Loukakis – The Memory of Tides
 David Malouf – Every Move You Make
 Andrew McGahan – Underground
 William McInnes – Cricket Kings
 Andrew O'Connor – Tuvalu
 D.B.C. Pierre – Ludmila's Broken English
 Cameron S. Redfern – Landscape with Animals
 Deborah Robertson – Careless 
 David Whish-Wilson – The Summons
 Mike Williams – The Music of Dunes
 Alexis Wright – Carpentaria

Children's and Young Adult fiction
 Catherine Bateson – Being Bee
 Michael Gerard Bauer – Don't Call Me Ishmael!
 Isobelle Carmody – A Fox Called Sorrow
 D. M. Cornish – Monster Blood Tattoo: Foundling
 Alison Croggon – The Crow
 Ursula Dubosarsky – The Red Shoe
 Mem Fox – A Particular Cow
 Jackie French – Macbeth and Son
 Lian Hearn – The Harsh Cry of the Heron
 Stephen Michael King – Layla, Queen of Hearts
 Margo Lanagan – Red Spikes
 Justine Larbalestier – Magic Lessons
 Kate McCaffrey – Destroying Avalon
 Melina Marchetta – On the Jellicoe Road
 Juliet Marillier – Wildwood Dancing
 John Marsden – Circle of Flight
 Jaclyn Moriarty – The Betrayal of Bindy Mackenzie
 Garth Nix – Sir Thursday
 Shaun Tan – The Arrival
 Scott Westerfeld
 The Last Days
 Peeps

Crime and Mystery
 Sydney Bauer – Undertow
 John Birmingham – Final Impact
 Laurent Boulanger – Better Dead Than Never
 Kirsty Brooks – The Lady Splash
 Marshall Browne
 Inspector Anders and the Blood Vendetta
 Rendezvous at Kamakura Inn
 Steve Caple – Blood On A Blue Line
 Paul Cleave – The Cleaner
 Peter Corris – The Undertow
 Kathryn Fox – Without Consent
 Edwina Grey – Prismatic
 Wayne Grogan – Vale Byron Bay
 Marion Halligan – The Apricot Colonel
 Katherine Howell – Frantic
 Adrian Hyland – Diamond Dove
 Martin Livings – Carnies
 Barry Maitland – Spider Trap
 P.D. Martin – The Murderers’ Club
Jaclyn Moriarty – The Betrayal of Bindi Mackenzie
 Tara Moss – Hit
 Kel Robertson – Dead Set
 David Rollins – A Knife Edge
 Angela Savage – Behind the Night Bazaar
 Lindsay Simpson – The Curer of Souls
 John Trigger – Upshot
 Michael White – Equinox

Romance
 Marion Campbell – Shadow Thief
 Sophia James – Ashblane's Lady
 Marion Lennox – Princess of Convenience
 Di Morrissey – The Valley

Science Fiction and Fantasy
 Damien Broderick – K-Machines
 D. M. Cornish – Monster Blood Tattoo 1: Foundling
 Sara Douglass – Druid's Sword
 Terry Dowling – Basic Black: Tales of Appropriate Fear
 Grace Dugan – The Silver Road
 Will Elliott – The Pilo Family Circus
 Edwina Grey – Prismatic
 Margo Lanagan – Red Spikes
 Martin J. Livings – Carnies
 Brett McBean – The Mother
 Sean McMullen – Voidfarer
 Michael Pryor – Blaze of Glory
 Sean Williams & Shane Dix – Geodesica Descent

Drama
 Jane Malone – The Rumour
 Tommy Murphy – Holding the Man
 Debra Oswald – The Peach Season
 Stephen Sewell – It Just Stopped

Poetry
 Robert Adamson – The Goldfinches of Baghdad
 Laurie Duggan – The Passenger
 Dennis Haskell – All the Time in the World
 Judy Johnson – Jack
 S.K. Kelen – Earthly Delights
 Graeme Miles – Phosphorescence
 Les Murray – The Biplane Houses
 Mark Reid – A Difficult Faith
 Thomas Shapcott – The City of Empty Rooms
 John Tranter – Urban Myths: 210 Poems
 Simon West – First Names
 Fay Zwicky – Picnic

Non-fiction
 Peter Andrews – Back from the Brink: How Australia's Landscape Can Be Saved
 Janine Burke – The Gods of Freud: Sigmund Freud's Art Collection
 Les Carlyon – The Great War
 Neil Chenoweth – Packer's Lunch
 Inga Clendinnen – Agamemnon's Kiss
 Peter Cochrane – Colonial Ambition: Foundations of Australian Democracy
 Peter Edwards – Arthur Tange: The Last of the Mandarins
 Ken Inglis – Whose ABC? The Australian Broadcasting Commission 1983-2006
 Justine Larbalestier – Daughters of Earth: Feminist Science Fiction in the Twentieth Century

Biographies
 Quentin Beresford – Rob Riley: an Aboriginal Leader's Quest for Justice
 Michael Gurr – Days Like These
 Robert Hughes – Things I Didn't Know
 Elizabeth Jolley & Caroline Lurie – Learning to Dance
 Sylvia Martin – Ida Leeson: A Life
 Chris Masters – Jonestown: The Power and the Myth of Alan Jones
 Alice Pung – Unpolished Gem

Awards and honours

Lifetime achievement

Fiction

International

National

Children and Young Adult

National

Crime and Mystery

National

Science Fiction

Non-Fiction

Poetry

Drama

Deaths
 12 January – Rae Sexton, poet (born 1936)
 16 March – Michael Dugan, writer for children (born 1947)
 14 April – Geoffrey Bewley, journalist and short story writer (born 1947)
 6 July – Lisa Bellear, poet (born 1961)
 10 July – Vera Newsom, poet (born 1912)
 16 August – Alex Buzo, dramatist (born 1944)
 4 September – Colin Thiele, writer for children  (born 1920)
 13 September – J. E. Macdonnell, novelist of the sea (born 1917)
 22 September – Joy Williams, poet (born 1942)
 3 October – Gwen Meredith, novelist (born 1907)
Unknown date

 Cecily Crozier, artist, poet and literary editor who co-founded A Comment (born 1911)

See also
 2006 in Australia
 2006 in literature
 2006 in poetry
 List of years in literature
 List of years in Australian literature
 List of Australian literary awards

References

Note: all references relating to awards can, or should be, found on the relevant award's page.

Literature
Australian literature by year
21st-century Australian literature
2006 in literature